The Fender Jaguar Bass is an electric bass guitar currently manufactured in Mexico by the Fender Musical Instruments Corporation.

Design 

In appearance, the Jaguar Bass is largely faithful to the original Fender Jaguar, with exception of the neck, bridge, and pickups taken from both the Fender Jazz Bass and Fender Precision Bass, though the Jaguar Deluxe Bass has only Jazz bass components. Rather than the standard dot position markers, however, the Jaguar bass has aged pearloid block inlays, a feature generally reserved for premium instruments. The bass also has a standard vintage-style top-loading  bridge and tuners. An onboard preamp is controlled by bass/treble boost rollers and an on/off switch located on the top control panel. The lower control panel holds on/off switches for each of the pickups, and a switch to toggle between parallel and series wiring of the pickups. Finally, the master control panel holds the master volume, master tone, and jack. Other features include an alder body, C-shaped maple neck, 7.25"-radius rosewood fretboard with 20 medium jumbo frets.

The basic tone of the Jaguar Bass is very similar to its stablemate, the Jazz Bass, and retains the signature "growl" of the latter. The complex controls, however, lend it a unique tonal flexibility not found in any other Fender instrument. For example, Bass Player Magazine notes that the Jaguar Bass can deliver "a convincing P-Bass sound ripe for Motown fingerstyle."

Differences in models include:

Fender Japan: first generation: 2005–2010. Available in Black and Hot Rod Red. Right-Handed versions only.

Fender Japan: second "deluxe" generation: 2011–unknown discontinue date. Available in 3-Color Sunburst, Black, Cobalt Blue and Candy Apple Red. Right-Handed versions only.

Fender American Standard Series: 2014–unknown discontinue date: Available in 3-Color Sunburst, Black, Olympic White, and Mystic Red.

Fender Player Series (Made in Mexico): 2018–present: Available in Tidepool, Silver, Capri Orange, Sonic Red (discontinued), and Sage Green Metallic (discontinued).

History
In 1960, Fender introduced the Jazz Bass, which was originally known as the "Deluxe Model" (in relation to the previously released Precision Bass).  Fender marketed the Jazz Bass as a stablemate to the Fender Stratocaster electric guitar, as it featured a narrower neck which was meant to appeal to jazz musicians.  The following year, Fender released the Bass VI, which featured six strings and a short-scale neck.  The Bass VI also had a switch-based control layout, and was essentially a precursor to the Fender Jaguar released in 1962.

Fender produced the Jaguar electric guitar until 1975, when both the Bass VI and Jaguar lines were discontinued.  However, the model was revived in 1999 due to the popularity of the Jaguar (and the similar Fender Jazzmaster) amongst indie rock musicians.  From 2004 to 2006, Fender also produced the Jaguar Bass VI Custom, a cross between the Bass VI and the Jaguar.

Prior to the forthcoming discontinuation of the Jaguar Bass VI Custom, Fender unveiled the Jaguar Bass at the 2006 annual NAMM show.  The Jaguar Bass was originally made available in the United States in Black and Hot Rod Red with a matching headstock. Although the Jaguar Bass was also manufactured in Olympic White and 3-color Sunburst, these finishes were only available in the Japanese domestic market. The full range of finish options was launched globally in 2008.

Variations

Squier Vintage Modified Jaguar Bass
2010–unknown discontinue date, available initially in Black, with Sunburst and Candy Apple Red models introduced in limited numbers starting in 2012. Right-Handed versions only.

In 2010, Fender introduced the premium priced Squier Vintage Modified Jaguar Bass with a black body, matching headstock and pearloid block inlays.
The bass is closer to the Jazzmaster than the Jaguar in appearance, due to the absence of any controls other than stacked volume/tone potentiometers similar in design to the early versions of the Jazz Bass. Other features include a P/J pickup layout, maple neck and rosewood fretboard.

Squier Vintage Modified Jaguar Bass Special
2011–unknown discontinue date, single coil version available in 3-Color Sunburst, Black and Crimson Red. Humbucker version in Black, Silver and Candy Apple Red. Right-Handed versions only.

In 2011, the Jaguar Bass Special was introduced with the choice of P/J ("P" as in Fender Precision Bass and "J" as in Fender Jazz Bass, and mixes the sounds of both) or single humbucker pickups and Jazz Bass knobs/control plate. While the Jaguar Bass Special features a split-coil Precision neck pickup and a single-coil Jazz Bass bridge pickup paired with an active bass boost circuit and treble control, the Jaguar Bass Special HB uses a high-output humbucking pickup and a 3-band active EQ. Other features include a solid basswood or agathis body (depending the finish) and a maple neck with a 20-fret rosewood fretboard and pearloid dot inlays. The 5-string version was introduced in 2013.

Squier Vintage Modified Jaguar Bass Special SS
Released mid-2011, discontinued until further notice in 2019, available in Black, Candy Apple Red and Silver. Right-Handed versions only.

This Short Scale model features a P/J set. It also features a solid agathis body, which is commonly used in the manufacture of low priced guitars due to its good resonating properties, yet relatively low price of production. Also a 20-fret maple neck with a rosewood fretboard and a short 30"-scale length, instead of the usual 34"-scale.

Modern Player Jaguar Bass
Fall 2011–2014, available in black only. Right-handed versions only.

The Modern Player Jaguar Bass sports a koto body, an unbound C-shaped maple neck, maple fretboard with 9.5-inch radius, black block inlays and 20 jumbo frets, three-ply parchment pickguard, two Modern Player PJ pickups, three Jazz Bass control knobs (neck volume, bridge volume, master tone), vintage-style four-saddle bridge with brass saddles, open-gear tuners and nickel/chrome hardware.

Pawn Shop Reverse Jaguar Bass
2012, available in 2-Color Sunburst, Black and Candy Apple Red. Right-Handed versions only.

Under the "Pawn Shop" series of 2012, Fender released a Jaguar Bass with a reverse body and headstock. It features a maple neck and fretboard with dot inlays, Dual "Music Man" humbucking pickups made famous on Ernie Ball "Music Man" basses, one volume and tone knob and one pickup selector switch and has a Medium (32") scale length. This bass is Mexican made.

American Standard Jaguar Bass

2014, available in 3-Color Sunburst, Olympic White (4-ply brown tortoiseshell pickguard), Black and Mystic Red (3-ply mint green pickguard). Right-Handed versions only.

Features an alder body, P/J configuration (alnico V split coil American Vintage '63 P-Bass pickup in the neck, ceramic single coil J-Bass pickup with adjustable hex-screw polepieces in the bridge) and a 20-fret graphite reinforced maple neck with a 9.5"-radius rosewood fingerboard and aged white pearloid rectangular block inlays. Other refinements include a StrongArm stealth retainer bar for the A string, Fender "F" lightweight vintage paddle tuners with tapered shafts and an HMV bridge. Controls include master volume, master tone,  pickup on/off and series/parallel switching and an active/passive switch for dual-circuit design with inset bass and treble control wheels.

Troy Sanders Jaguar Bass

Troy Sanders, who is the Bassist and Vocalist of Mastodon also has his own signature Jaguar Bass, available in both Fender and Squier Versions. The Fender Version has a matching headstock with the body, while the Squier version only has Black Headstock. The Fender version has mastodon logo featured on the neckplate and Squier Version in the headstock. Another thing is, The Fender Version has Active/Passive Switch, Bass Boost/Cut, and Treble Boost/cut, while Squier version lacks all of them. Both versions are Silverburst color with Pearloid Block Inlays, PJ pickups, one master volume, and active 3-band EQ.

Jaguar Bass players
 

 Sienna DeGovia
 Dave Bronze
 Rhydian Dafyyd
 Matt Freeman
 Eva Gardner
 Colin Greenwood
 Brad Heald
 Georg Hólm
 Hutch Hutchinson
 Justin Meldal-Johnsen
 Troy Sanders
 Tyler Joseph
 Pino Palladino
 Ryan Roberts
 Tyson Ritter
 Simon Rix
Chris Ross
 Matthew Taylor
 Sergio Vega
 Mikey Way
 Chris Edwards
 Mark Hoppus
 Mike Kerr
 Callum McFadden
 Stefan Olsdal

References

External links
Fender.com – Manufacturer's Official Site

Literature
Peter Bertges: The Fender Reference; Bomots, Saarbrücken 2007, 

Jaguar Bass
Products introduced in 2006